The list of ship launches in 1958 includes a chronological list of all ships launched in 1958.


References

1958
Ship launches